NCTC can refer to:
National Cable Television Cooperative
National Collection of Type Cultures
National Counter Terrorism Centre, India
National Counterterrorism Center, United States
National Conservation Training Center
Naval Construction Training Center in Gulfport, Mississippi
New Conservatory Theatre Center in San Francisco, California
NewVa Corridor Technology Council in Southwestern Virginia
North County Transit District's COASTER, reporting mark NCTC
North Central Texas College
Northeast Counterdrug Training Center in Pennsylvania
Northland Community & Technical College